The Criocerinae are a subfamily of the leaf beetles, or Chrysomelidae.

Tribes and genera
  Tribe Criocerini Latreille, 1804
 Crioceris Geoffroy, 1762
 Lilioceris Reitter, 1912
 Tribe Lemini Heinze, 1962
 Lema Fabricius, 1798
 Neolema Monrós, 1951
 Oulema Des Gozis, 1886

References

Bibliography 

 

 
Beetle subfamilies
Taxa named by Pierre André Latreille